Imoru Ayarna (c. 1917 – 11 July 2015) was a Ghanaian businessman and politician. He was the founder and leader of the erstwhile People's Action Party in Ghana.

1969 parliamentary election
Ayarna formed the PAP after the ban on party politics was lifted in 1969. He teamed up with Dr. W.K. Lutterodt, People's Popular Party (PPP), the Republican Party of Mr. Quaidoo and Dr. John Bilson's All People's Congress. He contested the Ghanaian parliamentary election on 29 August 1969 for a seat in the Parliament of Ghana during the second republic. His party won 2 seats out of 140, although he lost his seat, winning a total of 693 votes and beating only the All People's Republican Party candidate, Asigiri Israel Dawudu who had 323 votes. The seat was taken by the Progress Party led by Kofi Abrefa Busia.

Subversion trial
In late 1973, during the military rule of the National Redemption Council led by then Colonel I. K. Acheampong, he was tried along with others for plotting to overthrow the government by influencing then Colonel Robert Kotei, who was the Commander of the First Infantry Brigade at the time. His co-conspirators allegedly included Kojo Botsio, a former minister in the Nkrumah government, John Tettegah, a former general secretary of the All-African Trade Union Federation, Albert Kwaku Owusu Boateng, a journalist and Major Alexander Alanganona Awuviri, a Ghana Air Force officer. They all pleaded not guilty but were sentenced to death by firing squad after the trial though their sentences got commuted to life imprisonment later by the Head of state of Ghana, Colonel Acheampong.

1979 presidential election
In 1979, he contested the Ghanaian presidential election as an Independent candidate, winning 0.27% of the total votes cast.

References

See also
1969 Ghanaian parliamentary election
1979 Ghanaian presidential election
People's Action Party (Ghana)

1910s births
2015 deaths
Ghanaian MPs 1951–1954
People's Action Party (Ghana) politicians
Candidates for President of Ghana